The 4th constituency of the Pyrénées-Atlantiques (French: Quatrième circonscription des Pyrénées-Atlantiques) is a French legislative constituency in Pyrénées-Atlantiques département. Like the other 576 French constituencies, it elects one MP using the two-round system, with a run-off if no candidate receives over 50% of the vote in the first round.

Description

It includes the communes of Lourdios-Ichère, Oloron-Sainte-Marie and is currently represented by Iñaki Echaniz of the PS.

Deputies

Election results

2022

 
 
 
 
 
 
 
 
|-
| colspan="8" bgcolor="#E9E9E9"|
|-

2017 

|- style="background-color:#E9E9E9;text-align:center;"
! colspan="2" rowspan="2" style="text-align:left;" | Candidate
! rowspan="2" colspan="2" style="text-align:left;" | Party
! colspan="2" | 1st round
! colspan="2" | 2nd round
|- style="background-color:#E9E9E9;text-align:center;"
! width="75" | Votes
! width="30" | %
! width="75" | Votes
! width="30" | %
|-
| style="background-color:" |
| style="text-align:left;" | Loïc Corrégé
| style="text-align:left;" | La République En Marche!
| LREM
| 
| 25.41
| 
| 47.21
|-
| style="background-color:" |
| style="text-align:left;" | Jean Lassalle
| style="text-align:left;" | Miscellaneous Right
| DVD
| 
| 17.71
| 
| 52.79
|-
| style="background-color:" |
| style="text-align:left;" | Bernard Uthurry
| style="text-align:left;" | Socialist Party
| PS
| 
| 12.63
| colspan="2" style="text-align:left;" |
|-
| style="background-color:" |
| style="text-align:left;" | Marc Oxibar
| style="text-align:left;" | The Republicans
| LR
| 
| 9.66
| colspan="2" style="text-align:left;" |
|-
| style="background-color:" |
| style="text-align:left;" | Anita Lopepe
| style="text-align:left;" | Regionalist
| REG
| 
| 8.51
| colspan="2" style="text-align:left;" |
|-
| style="background-color:" |
| style="text-align:left;" | Didier Bayens
| style="text-align:left;" | La France Insoumise
| FI
| 
| 7.67
| colspan="2" style="text-align:left;" |
|-
| style="background-color:" |
| style="text-align:left;" | Laurent Inchauspé
| style="text-align:left;" | Union of Democrats and Independents
| UDI
| 
| 5.42
| colspan="2" style="text-align:left;" |
|-
| style="background-color:" |
| style="text-align:left;" | Gilles Hustaix
| style="text-align:left;" | National Front
| FN
| 
| 4.28
| colspan="2" style="text-align:left;" |
|-
| style="background-color:" |
| style="text-align:left;" | Robert Bareille
| style="text-align:left;" | Communist Party
| PCF
| 
| 3.35
| colspan="2" style="text-align:left;" |
|-
| style="background-color:" |
| style="text-align:left;" | Véronique Zenoni
| style="text-align:left;" | Ecologist
| ECO
| 
| 2.69
| colspan="2" style="text-align:left;" |
|-
| style="background-color:" |
| style="text-align:left;" | Bernard Arrabit
| style="text-align:left;" | Regionalist
| REG
| 
| 1.41
| colspan="2" style="text-align:left;" |
|-
| style="background-color:" |
| style="text-align:left;" | Véronique Dazord
| style="text-align:left;" | Debout la France
| DLF
| 
| 0.61
| colspan="2" style="text-align:left;" |
|-
| style="background-color:" |
| style="text-align:left;" | Lucile Souche
| style="text-align:left;" | Far Left
| EXG
| 
| 0.41
| colspan="2" style="text-align:left;" |
|-
| style="background-color:" |
| style="text-align:left;" | François-Xavier Dattin
| style="text-align:left;" | Independent
| DIV
| 
| 0.25
| colspan="2" style="text-align:left;" |
|-
| colspan="8" style="background-color:#E9E9E9;"|
|- style="font-weight:bold"
| colspan="4" style="text-align:left;" | Total
| 
| 100%
| 
| 100%
|-
| colspan="8" style="background-color:#E9E9E9;"|
|-
| colspan="4" style="text-align:left;" | Registered voters
| 
| style="background-color:#E9E9E9;"|
| 
| style="background-color:#E9E9E9;"|
|-
| colspan="4" style="text-align:left;" | Blank/Void ballots
| 
| 2.00%
| 
| 12.39%
|-
| colspan="4" style="text-align:left;" | Turnout
| 
| 58.53%
| 
| 53.37%
|-
| colspan="4" style="text-align:left;" | Abstentions
| 
| 41.47%
| 
| 46.63%
|-
| colspan="8" style="background-color:#E9E9E9;"|
|- style="font-weight:bold"
| colspan="6" style="text-align:left;" | Result
| colspan="2" style="background-color:" | DVD GAIN FROM MoDEM
|}

2012

|- style="background-color:#E9E9E9;text-align:center;"
! colspan="2" rowspan="2" style="text-align:left;" | Candidate
! rowspan="2" colspan="2" style="text-align:left;" | Party
! colspan="2" | 1st round
! colspan="2" | 2nd round
|- style="background-color:#E9E9E9;text-align:center;"
! width="75" | Votes
! width="30" | %
! width="75" | Votes
! width="30" | %
|-
| style="background-color:" |
| style="text-align:left;" | François Maitia
| style="text-align:left;" | Socialist Party
| PS
| 
| 31.99
| 
| 49.02
|-
| style="background-color:" |
| style="text-align:left;" | Jean Lassalle
| style="text-align:left;" | Democratic Movement
| MoDem
| 
| 26.28
| 
| 50.98
|-
| style="background-color:" |
| style="text-align:left;" | Marc Oxibar
| style="text-align:left;" | Union for a Popular Movement
| UMP
| 
| 17.63
| colspan="2" style="text-align:left;" |
|-
| style="background-color:" |
| style="text-align:left;" | Robert Bareille
| style="text-align:left;" | Left Front
| FG
| 
| 7.64
| colspan="2" style="text-align:left;" |
|-
| style="background-color:" |
| style="text-align:left;" | Anita Lopepe
| style="text-align:left;" | Regionalist
| REG
| 
| 6.80
| colspan="2" style="text-align:left;" |
|-
| style="background-color:" |
| style="text-align:left;" | Catherine Boutelant-Jeser
| style="text-align:left;" | National Front
| FN
| 
| 4.45
| colspan="2" style="text-align:left;" |
|-
| style="background-color:" |
| style="text-align:left;" | Alice Leiciaguecahar
| style="text-align:left;" | The Greens
| LV
| 
| 2.27
| colspan="2" style="text-align:left;" |
|-
| style="background-color:" |
| style="text-align:left;" | Pako Arizmendi
| style="text-align:left;" | Regionalist
| REG
| 
| 0.89
| colspan="2" style="text-align:left;" |
|-
| style="background-color:" |
| style="text-align:left;" | Eric Petetin
| style="text-align:left;" | Ecologist
| ECO
| 
| 0.54
| colspan="2" style="text-align:left;" |
|-
| style="background-color:" |
| style="text-align:left;" | Danielle Schaff
| style="text-align:left;" | Miscellaneous Right
| DVD
| 
| 0.48
| colspan="2" style="text-align:left;" |
|-
| style="background-color:" |
| style="text-align:left;" | Thierry Buisson
| style="text-align:left;" | Ecologist
| ECO
| 
| 0.44
| colspan="2" style="text-align:left;" |
|-
| style="background-color:" |
| style="text-align:left;" | Pedro Carrasquedo
| style="text-align:left;" | Far Left
| EXG
| 
| 0.38
| colspan="2" style="text-align:left;" |
|-
| style="background-color:" |
| style="text-align:left;" | Berthe Ratsimba
| style="text-align:left;" | Far Left
| EXG
| 
| 0.21
| colspan="2" style="text-align:left;" |
|-
| colspan="8" style="background-color:#E9E9E9;"|
|- style="font-weight:bold"
| colspan="4" style="text-align:left;" | Total
| 
| 100%
| 
| 100%
|-
| colspan="8" style="background-color:#E9E9E9;"|
|-
| colspan="4" style="text-align:left;" | Registered voters
| 
| style="background-color:#E9E9E9;"|
| 
| style="background-color:#E9E9E9;"|
|-
| colspan="4" style="text-align:left;" | Blank/Void ballots
| 
| 1.67%
| 
| 5.34%
|-
| colspan="4" style="text-align:left;" | Turnout
| 
| 64.96%
| 
| 66.17%
|-
| colspan="4" style="text-align:left;" | Abstentions
| 
| 35.04%
| 
| 33.83%
|-
| colspan="8" style="background-color:#E9E9E9;"|
|- style="font-weight:bold"
| colspan="6" style="text-align:left;" | Result
| colspan="2" style="background-color:" | MoDEM HOLD
|}

2007

|- style="background-color:#E9E9E9;text-align:center;"
! colspan="2" rowspan="2" style="text-align:left;" | Candidate
! rowspan="2" colspan="2" style="text-align:left;" | Party
! colspan="2" | 1st round
! colspan="2" | 2nd round
|- style="background-color:#E9E9E9;text-align:center;"
! width="75" | Votes
! width="30" | %
! width="75" | Votes
! width="30" | %
|-
| style="background-color:" |
| style="text-align:left;" | Hervé Lucbereilh
| style="text-align:left;" | Union for a Popular Movement
| UMP
| 
| 31.36
| 
| 33.65
|-
| style="background-color:" |
| style="text-align:left;" | Jean Lassalle
| style="text-align:left;" | UDF-Democratic Movement
| UDF-MoDem
| 
| 29.54
| 
| 40.39
|-
| style="background-color:" |
| style="text-align:left;" | Jean-Pierre Domecq
| style="text-align:left;" | Socialist Party
| PS
| 
| 19,86
| 
| 25.96
|-
| style="background-color:" |
| style="text-align:left;" | Marie-Léonie Aguergaray
| style="text-align:left;" | Regionalist
| REG
| 
| 6.32
| colspan="2" style="text-align:left;" |
|-
| style="background-color:" |
| style="text-align:left;" | Louis Labadot
| style="text-align:left;" | Communist Party
| PCF
| 
| 4.36
| colspan="2" style="text-align:left;" |
|-
| style="background-color:" |
| style="text-align:left;" | Bernard Sicre
| style="text-align:left;" | Hunting, Fishing, Nature and Traditions
| CPNT
| 
| 2.20
| colspan="2" style="text-align:left;" |
|-
| style="background-color:" |
| style="text-align:left;" | Jenofa Cuisset
| style="text-align:left;" | The Greens
| LV
| 
| 1.96
| colspan="2" style="text-align:left;" |
|-
| style="background-color:" |
| style="text-align:left;" | Jean Haïra
| style="text-align:left;" | Far Left
| EXG
| 
| 1.53
| colspan="2" style="text-align:left;" |
|-
| style="background-color:" |
| style="text-align:left;" | Hélène Barbace
| style="text-align:left;" | National Front
| FN
| 
| 1.12
| colspan="2" style="text-align:left;" |
|-
| style="background-color:" |
| style="text-align:left;" | Jean-Marie Puyau
| style="text-align:left;" | Independent
| DIV
| 
| 0.56
| colspan="2" style="text-align:left;" |
|-
| style="background-color:" |
| style="text-align:left;" | Jean-Claude Laborde
| style="text-align:left;" | Ecologist
| ECO
| 
| 0.55
| colspan="2" style="text-align:left;" |
|-
| style="background-color:" |
| style="text-align:left;" | Berthe Ratsimba
| style="text-align:left;" | Far Left
| EXG
| 
| 0.40
| colspan="2" style="text-align:left;" |
|-
| style="background-color:" |
| style="text-align:left;" | Thierry Richard
| style="text-align:left;" | Independent
| DIV
| 
| 0.23
| colspan="2" style="text-align:left;" |
|-
| colspan="8" style="background-color:#E9E9E9;"|
|- style="font-weight:bold"
| colspan="4" style="text-align:left;" | Total
| 
| 100%
| 
| 100%
|-
| colspan="8" style="background-color:#E9E9E9;"|
|-
| colspan="4" style="text-align:left;" | Registered voters
| 
| style="background-color:#E9E9E9;"|
| 
| style="background-color:#E9E9E9;"|
|-
| colspan="4" style="text-align:left;" | Blank/Void ballots
| 
| 1.67%
| 
| 2.26%
|-
| colspan="4" style="text-align:left;" | Turnout
| 
| 68.70%
| 
| 71.94%
|-
| colspan="4" style="text-align:left;" | Abstentions
| 
| 31.30%
| 
| 28.06%
|-
| colspan="8" style="background-color:#E9E9E9;"|
|- style="font-weight:bold"
| colspan="6" style="text-align:left;" | Result
| colspan="2" style="background-color:" | UDF-MoDem HOLD
|}

2002

|- style="background-color:#E9E9E9;text-align:center;"
! colspan="2" rowspan="2" style="text-align:left;" | Candidate
! rowspan="2" colspan="2" style="text-align:left;" | Party
! colspan="2" | 1st round
! colspan="2" | 2nd round
|- style="background-color:#E9E9E9;text-align:center;"
! width="75" | Votes
! width="30" | %
! width="75" | Votes
! width="30" | %
|-
| style="background-color:" |
| style="text-align:left;" | Francois Maitia
| style="text-align:left;" | Socialist Party
| PS
| 
| 25.51
| 
| 42.95
|-
| style="background-color:" |
| style="text-align:left;" | Jean Lassalle
| style="text-align:left;" | Union for French Democracy
| UDF
| 
| 24.13
| 
| 57.05
|-
| style="background-color:" |
| style="text-align:left;" | Louis Althape
| style="text-align:left;" | Union for a Presidential Majority
| UMP
| 
| 22.88
| colspan="2" style="text-align:left;" |
|-
| style="background-color:" |
| style="text-align:left;" | J. Jacques Cazaurang
| style="text-align:left;" | Hunting, Fishing, Nature and Traditions
| CPNT
| 
| 6.22
| colspan="2" style="text-align:left;" |
|-
| style="background-color:" |
| style="text-align:left;" | Pierre Iralour
| style="text-align:left;" | Regionalist
| REG
| 
| 5.36
| colspan="2" style="text-align:left;" |
|-
| style="background-color:" |
| style="text-align:left;" | Louis Labadot
| style="text-align:left;" | Communist Party
| PCF
| 
| 4.69
| colspan="2" style="text-align:left;" |
|-
| style="background-color:" |
| style="text-align:left;" | Lucien Garondi
| style="text-align:left;" | National Front
| FN
| 
| 3.53
| colspan="2" style="text-align:left;" |
|-
| style="background-color:" |
| style="text-align:left;" | Genevieve Cuisset
| style="text-align:left;" | The Greens
| LV
| 
| 2.05
| colspan="2" style="text-align:left;" |
|-
| style="background-color:" |
| style="text-align:left;" | Roger Desport
| style="text-align:left;" | Far Right
| EXD
| 
| 1.69
| colspan="2" style="text-align:left;" |
|-
| style="background-color:" |
| style="text-align:left;" | Francis Charpentier
| style="text-align:left;" | Revolutionary Communist League
| LCR
| 
| 1.46
| colspan="2" style="text-align:left;" |
|-
| style="background-color:" |
| style="text-align:left;" | Pierre Etchepare
| style="text-align:left;" | Regionalist
| REG
| 
| 0.83
| colspan="2" style="text-align:left;" |
|-
| style="background-color:" |
| style="text-align:left;" | Berthe Ratsimba
| style="text-align:left;" | Workers’ Struggle
| LO
| 
| 0.72
| colspan="2" style="text-align:left;" |
|-
| style="background-color:" |
| style="text-align:left;" | Thierry Labaquere Dit Barocq
| style="text-align:left;" | National Republican Movement
| MNR
| 
| 0.48
| colspan="2" style="text-align:left;" |
|-
| style="background-color:" |
| style="text-align:left;" | Marcel Mignot
| style="text-align:left;" | Movement for France
| MPF
| 
| 0.46
| colspan="2" style="text-align:left;" |
|-
| style="background-color:" |
| style="text-align:left;" | Maite Goyenetche
| style="text-align:left;" | Regionalist
| REG
| 
| 0.03
| colspan="2" style="text-align:left;" |
|-
| colspan="8" style="background-color:#E9E9E9;"|
|- style="font-weight:bold"
| colspan="4" style="text-align:left;" | Total
| 
| 100%
| 
| 100%
|-
| colspan="8" style="background-color:#E9E9E9;"|
|-
| colspan="4" style="text-align:left;" | Registered voters
| 
| style="background-color:#E9E9E9;"|
| 
| style="background-color:#E9E9E9;"|
|-
| colspan="4" style="text-align:left;" | Blank/Void ballots
| 
| 2.45%
| 
| 4.32%
|-
| colspan="4" style="text-align:left;" | Turnout
| 
| 70.11%
| 
| 68.39%
|-
| colspan="4" style="text-align:left;" | Abstentions
| 
| 29.89%
| 
| 31.61%
|-
| colspan="8" style="background-color:#E9E9E9;"|
|- style="font-weight:bold"
| colspan="6" style="text-align:left;" | Result
| colspan="2" style="background-color:" | UDF GAIN FROM RPR
|}

Sources
 French Interior Ministry results website: 

4